The huge moth family Noctuidae contains the following genera:

A B C D E F G H I J K L M N O P Q R S T U V W X Y Z

Pabulatrix
Pachetra
Pachnobia
Pachyagrotis
Pachycoa
Pachygnathesis
Pachyplastis
Pachypolia
Pachythrix
Pacidara
Paectes
Paetica
Pagyra
Paida
Pais
Palada
Palaeagrotis
Palaeamathes
Palaechthona
Palaeocoleus
Palaeographa
Palaeoplusia
Palaeosafia
Palindia
Palindiona
Palkermes
Pallachira
Palpangula
Palpidia
Palpirectia
Palponima
Palthis
Palthisomis
Palura
Palyna
Pamirorea
Pamparama
Panarenia
Panchrysia
Pancra
Pandesma
Panemeria
Pangrapta
Pangraptella
Pangraptica
Panilla
Panoblemma
Panolis
Panopoda
Pansemna
Pantura
Pantydia
Panula
Paonidia
Papaipema
Papestra
Papuacola
Parabagrotis
Parabarrovia
Parabole
Parabrachionycha
Parabrachylomia
Parabryophila
Paracaroides
Paracarsia
Paraceliptera
Paracentropus
Parachabora
Parachaea
Parachalciope
Paracodia
Paracoeria
Paracolax
Paracretonia
Paracroma
Paracroria
Paracullia
Paradiarsia
Paradiopa
Paradrina
Paraegle
Paraegocera
Parafodina
Paragabara
Paragarista
Paragona
Paragonitis
Paragria
Paragrotis
Parahypenodes
Paralectra
Paralephana
Parallelia
Parallelura
Paralopha
Paralophata
Paramathes
Paramiana
Paramimetica
Paramocis
Paranagia
Paranataelia
Parangitia
Paranicla
Paranoctua
Paranoratha
Paranyctycia
Parapadna
Parapamea
Paraperplexia
Parargidia
Pararothia
Parasada
Parascotia
Parasimyra
Parasiopsis
Parasoloe
Parastenopterygia
Parastichtis
Parathermes
Paratolna
Paratrachea
Paratuerta
Paraviminia
Paraxestia
Parca
Parelectra
Parelia
Parerastria
Pareuchalcia
Pareuplexia
Pareuxoa
Pareuxoina
Parexarnis
Parhypena
Pariambia
Parilyrgis
Paroligia
Parolulis
Paromphale
Parora
Parorena
Paroruza
Parosmia
Parothria
Parsyngrapha
Parvablemma
Parvapenna
Paryrias
Pasipeda
Pastona
Pataeta
Paucgraphia
Paurophylla
Paurosceles
Paventia
Pechipogo
Pectinidia
Pectinifera
Pediarcha
Pelamia
Pelecia
Peliala
Pelodesis
Pelodia
Peltothis
Pemphigostola
Penicillaria
Penisa
Pennalticola
Penza
Peosina
Peperina
Peperita
Peraniana
Peranomogyna
Peranua
Perasia
Perata
Percalpe
Perciana
Periambia
Periconta
Pericyma
Peridroma
Peridrome
Perigea
Perigeodes
Perigonica
Perigrapha
Perinaenia
Periopta
Periphanes
Periphrage
Peripyra
Periscepta
Perissandria
Perloplusia
Peropalpus
Perophiusa
Perplexhadena
Persectania
Persidia
Perta
Perynea
Pessida
Petalumaria
Peteroma
Petilampa
Petrowskya
Peucephila
Phachthia
Phaegorista
Phaenagrotis
Phaeoblemma
Phaeocyma
Phaeomorpha
Phaeopyra
Phaeoscia
Phaeozona
Phagytra
Phaioecia
Phalaenoides
Phalaenophana
Phalaenostola
Phalerodes
Phalga
Phanaspa
Pharga
Phasidia
Pherechoa
Phialta
Phibromia
Phidrimana
Philareta
Philecia
Philippodamias
Philochrysia
Philogethes
Philomma
Philona
Philorgyia
Phimodium
Phleboeis
Phlegetonia
Phlogochroa
Phlogophora
Phlyctaina
Phoberia
Phobolosia
Phoebophilus
Phoenicophanta
Phoperigea
Phorica
Phornacisa
Phosphila
Photedes
Phragmatiphila
Phrictia
Phrodita
Phumana
Phuphena
Phurys
Phycidimorpha
Phycoma
Phycopterus
Phylapora
Phyllodes
Phyllophila
Phyprosopus
Physetica
Physula
Physulodes
Phytometra
Piada
Piala
Piana
Pilipectus
Pilosocrures
Pimprana
Pinacia
Pinacoplus
Pincia
Pindara
Pinkericola
Pippona
Piratisca
Pitara
Pityolita
Placerobela
Placonia
Plagerepne
Plagideicta
Plagiomimicus
Plantea
Plasmaticus
Platagarista
Platagrotis
Plataplecta
Plathypena
Platydasys
Platyja
Platyjionia
Platyperigea
Platypolia
Platyprosopa
Platyscia
Platysenta
Plaxia
Plecoptera
Plecopterodes
Plecopteroides
Pleonectopoda
Pleonotrocta
Pleromella
Pleromelloida
Pleuromnema
Pleurona
Pleuronodes
Plexiphleps
Plumipalpia
Plusia
Plusidia
Plusilla
Plusiodonta
Plusiopalpa
Plusiophaes
Plusiotricha
Pluxilloides
Plynteria
Poaphila
Podagra
Poecopa
Poena
Poenomia
Poenopsis
Poeonoma
Poesula
Poeta
Pogopus
Polacanthopoda
Polenta
Polia
Policocnemis
Poliobrya
Poliodestra
Poliofoca
Polionycta
Polychrysia
Polydesma
Polydesmiola
Polygnamptia
Polygoniodes
Polygrammate
Polygrapta
Polymixis
Polyorycta
Polyphaenis
Polypogon
Polysciera
Polytela
Polytelodes
Ponometia
Poporthosia
Poppaea
Porosagrotis
Porosana
Porphyrinia
Porrima
Poteriophora
Potnyctycia
Powellinia
Pradatta
Pradiota
Praestilbia
Praina
Prasinopyra
Praxis
Premusia
Prenanthcucullia
Pricomia
Prionofrontia
Prionoptera
Prionopterina
Prionoxanthia
Pristanepa
Pristoceraea
Proannaphila
Prochloridea
Procoeria
Proconis
Procrateria
Procriosis
Procus
Prodenia
Prodicella
Prodosia
Prodotis
Prognorisma
Progonia
Prolitha
Prolophota
Proluta
Prolymnia
Prolyncestis
Prometopus
Prominea
Promionides
Promonia
Pronoctua
Pronotestra
Propatria
Propenistra
Properigea
Propolymixis
Prorachia
Proragrotis
Prorivula
Proroblemma
Prorocopis
Proruaca
Proschora
Proscrana
Proseniella
Prosoparia
Prospalta
Prostheta
Protadisura
Protagrotis
Protarache
Protarchanara
Proteinania
Proteuxoa
Protexarnis
Protheodes
Prothrinax
Protocryphia
Protodeltote
Protogygia
Protolampra
Protoleucania
Protomeceras
Protomeroleuca
Protomiselia
Protoperigea
Protophana
Protorthodes
Protoschinia
Protoschrankia
Protoseudyra
Prototrachea
Provia
Proxenus
Psammathodoxa
Psaphara
Psaphida
Psectraglaea
Psectraxylia
Psectrotarsia
Psephea
Pseudacidalia
Pseudacontia
Pseudaglossa
Pseudagoma
Pseudalea
Pseudalelimma
Pseudaletia
Pseudalypia
Pseudamathes
Pseudanarta
Pseudanchoscelis
Pseudanthoecia
Pseudanthracia
Pseudaporophyla
Pseudapospasta
Pseudarista
Pseudathetis
Pseudathyrma
Pseudbarydia
Pseudcraspedia
Pseudelaeodes
Pseudelyptron
Pseudenargia
Pseudephyra
Pseudepunda
Pseuderastria
Pseuderiopus
Pseudeustrotia
Pseudeva
Pseudhypsa
Pseudina
Pseudinodes
Pseudoarcte
Pseudobendis
Pseudobryomima
Pseudobryophila
Pseudocerura
Pseudochalcia
Pseudochropleura
Pseudocoarica
Pseudocopicucullia
Pseudocopivaleria
Pseudodeltoida
Pseudodeltote
Pseudodichromia
Pseudogerespa
Pseudogiria
Pseudoglaea
Pseudogonitis
Pseudogyrtona
Pseudohadena
Pseudohemiceras
Pseudohermonassa
Pseucoleucania
Pseudoligia
Pseudolimacodes
Pseudomecia
Pseudomicra
Pseudomicrodes
Pseudomniotype
Pseudonycterophaeta
Pseudopais
Pseudopanolis
Pseudophisma
Pseudophyllophila
Pseudophyx
Pseudoplusia
Pseudopolia
Pseudopseustis
Pseudorgyia
Pseudorthodes
Pseudorthosia
Pseudoschrankia
Pseudoseptis
Pseudosiccia
Pseudospaelotis
Pseudosphetta
Pseudospiris
Pseudostella
Pseudotamila
Pseudotolna
Pseudotryphia
Pseudotuerta
Pseudoxestia
Pseudoxylomoea
Pseudozalissa
Pseudozarba
Pseudugia
Pseudypsia
Pseudyrias
Psilomonodes
Psimada
Psorya
Psychomorpha
Pteraetholix
Pterhemia
Pterochaeta
Pterocyclophora
Pteronycta
Pteroprista
Pteroscia
Ptichodis
Ptochosiphla
Ptyophora
Ptyopterota
Ptyornyncha
Puercala
Pulcheria
Pumora
Purbia
Puriplusia
Purpurschinia
Pusillathetis
Putagrotis
Pycnodontis
Pygmeopolia
Pygopteryx
Pyralidesthes
Pyraloides
Pyralomorpha
Pyramarista
Pyramidcampa
Pyreferra
Pyrgeia
Pyrgion
Pyripnoa
Pyroblemma
Pyrocleptria
Pyrois
Pyrrhia
Pyrrhidivalva

References 

 Natural History Museum Lepidoptera genus database

 
Noctuid genera P